This is a bibliography of the works of Anthony Trollope.

Novels

Single novels

Novel series

Chronicles of Barsetshire

Palliser novels

Irish novels

Short stories
 Tales of All Countries, 1st Series (1861)
 "La Mère Bauche"
 "The O'Conors of Castle Conor"
 "John Bull on the Guadalquivir"
 "Miss Sarah Jack, of Spanish Town, Jamaica"
 "The Courtship of Susan Bell"
 "Relics of General Chassé"
 "An Unprotected Female At the Pyramids"
 "The Château of Prince Polignac"
 Tales of All Countries 2nd Series (1863)
 "Aaron Trow"
 "Mrs. General Talboys"
 "The Parson's Daughter of Oxney Colne"
 "George Walker At Suez"
 "The Mistletoe Bough"
 "Returning Home"
 "A Ride Across Palestine"
 "The House of Heine Brothers in Munich"
 "The Man Who Kept His Money In a Box"
 "Gentle Euphemia" (1866)
 Lotta Schmidt & Other Stories (1867)
 "Lotta Schmidt"
 "The Adventures of Fred Pickering"
 "The Two Generals"
 "Father Giles of Ballymoy" 
 "Malachi's Cove"
 "The Widow's Mite"
 "The Last Austrian Who Left Venice"
 "Miss Ophelia Gledd"
 "The Journey to Panama"
 An Editor's Tales (1870)
 "The Turkish Bath"
 "Mary Gresley"
 "Josephine De Montmorenci"
 "The Panjandrum"
 "The Spotted Dog"
 "Mrs. Brumby"
 "Christmas at Kirkby Cottage" (1870)
 "Never, Never -- Never, Never" (1875)
 "Catherine Carmichael" (1878)
 Why Frau Frohmann Raised Her Prices and other Stories (1882)
 "Why Frau Frohmann Raised Her Prices"
 "The Lady of Launay"
 "Christmas At Thompson Hall"
 "The Telegraph Girl"
 "Alice Dugdale"
 The Two Heroines of Plumplington (1882)
 "Not If I Know It"

Non-fiction

Articles

Plays
 Did He Steal It? (1869).
 The Noble Jilt (1923).

Letters
 The Tireless Traveler: Twenty Letters to the Liverpool Mercury, ed., by B. A. Booth (1941).
 The Letters of Anthony Trollope, ed., by B. A. Booth (1951).
 The Letters of Anthony Trollope, ed., by N. John Hall (2 vols., 1983).

References

External links

 
 
 
 
 Anthony Trollope — Google Books

Bibliographies by writer
Bibliographies of British writers
Bibliography